Favel Parrett (born 1974) is an Australian writer.

Career

Parrett's first novel, Past the Shallows, was shortlisted for the Miles Franklin Award in 2012 and also that year won the Dobbie Literary Prize and Newcomer of the Year at the Australian Book Industry Awards. She was awarded the Antarctic Arts Fellowship, allowing her to travel to Antarctica to complete research for her second novel, When the Night Comes. Her latest adult novel, There Was Still Love, was published in September 2019 by Hachette Australia.

Her first children’s book, Wandi, was published in September 2021. It is a fictional retelling of the true story of a purebred Alpine dingo cub that survived being dropped by an eagle into the backyard of a home in the small town of Wandiligong, in Victoria’s alpine valleys, and later became the subject of a successful research and breeding program for the threatened species.

Parrett also writes short stories, which have been published in journals and anthologies including Meanjin, Island, Best Australian Stories and Griffith Review.

Bibliography

Novels
Past the Shallows (2011)
 When the Night Comes (2014)
 There Was Still Love (2019)
Wandi (2021)

Awards
 2012 winner of the Dobbie Award
 2012 shortlisted Booksellers Choice Award
 2012 finalist Melbourne Prize — Best Writing Award
 2012 shortlisted Miles Franklin Literary Award
 2012 shortlisted Australian Book Industry Awards (ABIA) — Australian Literary Fiction Book of the Year
 2012 winner Australian Book Industry Awards (ABIA) — Australian Newcomer of the Year
 2015 longlisted Miles Franklin Literary Award
 2015 shortlisted ASAL Awards — ALS Gold Medal
 2015 shortlisted Australian Book Industry Awards (ABIA) — Australian Literary Fiction Book of the Year
 2015 shortlisted The Indie Books Awards
 2015 shortlisted ABA's Booksellers Choice Award
 2020 shortlisted Stella Prize
2020 winner Indie Book Awards Book of the Year and Fiction Book of the Year
2020 shortlisted for ALS Gold Medal
2022 shortlisted for Indie Book Awards Children's Book

References

External links
 Author's website
  Review of When the night comes.

Living people
Australian women novelists
21st-century Australian novelists
Date of birth missing (living people)
21st-century Australian women writers
1974 births